Bajus is a commune in the Pas-de-Calais department in the Hauts-de-France region in northern France.

Geography
A farming village located 20 miles (32 km) northwest of Arras at the junction of the D86E and D86E1 roads.

Population

Sights
 The church of St. Vaast, dating from the eighteenth century.
 The motte and moat of an old castle.
 The eighteenth-century chateau.

See also
Communes of the Pas-de-Calais department

References

Communes of Pas-de-Calais